The 1932 Coupe de France Final was a football match held at Stade Olympique Yves-du-Manoir, Colombes on April 24, 1932, that saw AS Cannes defeat RC Roubaix 1–0 thanks to a goal by Louis Cler.

Match details

See also
Coupe de France 1931-1932

External links
Coupe de France results at Rec.Sport.Soccer Statistics Foundation
Report on French federation site

Coupe
1932
Coupe De France Final 1932
Sport in Hauts-de-Seine
Coupe de France Final
Coupe de France Final